The Electoral district of Midlands was an electoral district of the Victorian Legislative Assembly. 
It was created in the 1945 redistribution and mainly consisted of the abolished Bulla and Dalhousie and Castlemaine and Kyneton districts.

Members for Midlands

Election results

See also
 Parliaments of the Australian states and territories
 List of members of the Victorian Legislative Assembly

References

Former electoral districts of Victoria (Australia)
1945 establishments in Australia
1985 disestablishments in Australia